U.S. President Donald Trump has had unusual approaches to the practice of handshaking; his handshakes with world leaders since his inauguration as U.S. President have been the subject of extensive commentary. Scholars have noted that politician's handshakes are usually unnoticed, or restricted to silent interpretation by the participants, and only in the case of Donald Trump do they appear have garnered wide media attention.

Notable incidents of handshakes (and avoidance of handshakes) involving Trump have included interactions with French president Emmanuel Macron, Japanese prime minister Shinzo Abe, Canadian prime minister Justin Trudeau, German chancellor Angela Merkel, and U.S. leaders including then Director of the FBI James Comey, and Supreme Court Justice nominee Neil Gorsuch. The same characteristic has been identified during his 2016 presidential campaign, although it was not widely reported at the time.  The Washington Post reported that "Trump has a habit of sharing awkward, intense and sometimes downright strange handshakes with world leaders and U.S. officials", and world leaders prepare themselves to counteract the handshake from Trump. The Guardian said that Trump's handshake style is a way to assert his superiority, and New Statesman called it a show of masculinity. Psychology professor Florin Dolcos found it to be part of Trump's strategic way of interacting with world leaders.

Commentators have claimed that Trump has germophobic views relating to handshaking; Trump has at times deemed handshaking to be "barbaric, disgusting and 'very, very terrible. Trump's approach to handshaking became a further subject of public debate during the COVID-19 pandemic, after he predicted that the social convention may come to an end, but that as a politician he would continue shaking hands due to its "deep-seated symbolic meaning".

Notable handshakes

 Director of the FBI James Comey, on January 22, 2017: Trump reportedly "pulled in Comey with that signature tug and an attempted hug" which was said to have "appalled" Comey.
 Prime Minister of Japan Shinzo Abe, on February 10, 2017: their handshake lasted 19 seconds, visibly disconcerting Abe and prompting "a memorable eye-roll from the Japanese leader".
 Prime Minister of Canada Justin Trudeau, on February 13, 2017: their handshake attracted attention for Trudeau's "notably strong, extended grip with Mr Trump".
 Chancellor of Germany Angela Merkel, on March 17, 2017: they did not shake hands.
 Supreme Court Justice nominee Neil Gorsuch, at his April 7, 2017, nomination ceremony: Gorsuch was reportedly "almost jerked... off his feet" by Trump, who "yank[ed] the judge towards him as if he were a pet dog on a leash".
 President of France Emmanuel Macron, at the May 25, 2017, NATO summit: a five-second-long handshake in which it was reported that Macron's knuckles turned white and Trump "appeared to painfully twist [Macron's] arm"; and on Bastille Day, July 14, 2017: a 29-second-long encounter that was covered extensively, including a second-by-second commentary by CNN.

Reactions

Macron said that his five-second-long handshake with Trump in July was deliberate. He stated, "My handshake with him was not innocent." He added, "We need to show that we won't make small concessions, even symbolic ones, while not over-hyping things either." Macron went further to comment on the dynamic of power expressed by world leaders: "Donald Trump, the Turkish president or the Russian president believe in the logic of the trial of strength, which doesn't bother me. I don't believe in the diplomacy of public invective, but in my bilateral dialogues, I don't let anything pass, that is how we are respected".
 
Trump said of his handshakes with Macron: "He's a great guy – smart, strong, loves holding my hand". He went on to say, "People don't realize he loves holding my hand. And that's good, as far as that goes." Trump further explained, "I mean, really. He's a very good person. And a tough guy, but look, he has to be. I think he is going to be a terrific president of France. But he does love holding my hand".

The Independent reported, "Some world leaders have started preparing for a handshake-showdown with the President. Canadian Prime Minister Justin Trudeau attracted attention for his notably strong, extended grip with Mr Trump when the two met in February". U.S. government-funded media outlet VOA News analyzed a series of Trump handshakes, writing, "Since Trump took office on January 20, many world leaders, and even American politicians, have discovered they need to be ready for an unusual handshake from the U.S. president".

Analysis

Media analysis
CNN performed a second-by-second analysis of Donald Trump's Bastille Day handshake with Macron. CNN editor-at-large Chris Cillizza wrote, "President Donald Trump added to the growing lore of his handshakes with world leaders on Friday in France when he and French president Emmanuel Macron spent 29 seconds in a shake that turned into something much, much more." The Guardian journalist Peter Collett commented, "Another way Trump reminds people of his superior status is by patting them on the arm or back during or after the handshake, and if the other person is so bold as to pat him back, he trumps them by producing an additional, terminal pat". Collett's fellow reporter at The Guardian, Moustafa Bayoumi wrote, "it really is beginning to look like you can read Donald Trump's foreign policy by the bizarre ways that he shakes the hands of foreign leaders". National Review journalist Noah Daponte-Smith commented, "the handshake between President Trump, visiting Paris for the occasion, and Emmanuel Macron, the recently elected French president. Trump has already achieved notoriety for his awkward handshakes, but this one is truly something to behold".

Daponte-Smith observed the attention placed on Trump's handshakes with other world leaders, "Trump's conduct toward his fellow heads of state, both in one-on-one meetings and in larger groups, has become a topic of great interest over the last few months: His handshakes with Justin Trudeau, Angela Merkel, and Shinzo Abe have also attracted great attention". New Statesman journalist Ruby Lott-Lavigna commented, "For President Trump, masculinity lies in the act of a handshake". The Financial Times noted that Trump is a self-confessed "germaphobe" who once said handshakes were "barbaric". New Statesman analyzed different tactics used by Trump for different world leaders. The Independent consulted psychologists who described the handshakes as a "tactical" move. The New York Times also consulted a body language expert who said this prolonged interaction was an attempt by each to show dominance.

Time provided a chronology of Trump's handshakes over time, noting, "Newly inaugurated French President Emmanuel Macron drew international headlines when his knuckles turned white during an intense handshake with President Donald Trump at the G-7 meeting".  Time observed, "Sometimes, a lack of a handshake says even more. The President drew similar fanfare when he declined to shake the hand of German Chancellor Angela Merkel when she visited the White House." The Washington Post reporter Peter W. Stevenson commented, "Trump has a habit of sharing awkward, intense and sometimes downright strange handshakes with world leaders and U.S. officials." Stevenson contacted St. John's University psychology department chair, professor William Chaplin, for behavioral analysis of Trump's handshakes.  Chaplin noted of his research, "People with good handshakes tended to be more outgoing, more socially at ease, less socially anxious". VOA News interviewed Success Signals author Patti Wood and Asheville, North Carolina mayor Esther Manheimer about the phenomenon.  Wood observed Trudeau attempting to turn his experience with Trump into a "power handshake" by placing his hand on Trump's arm. The New York Times reporter Katie Rogers noted, "Analyzing President Trump's handshakes with world leaders has become something of a sport". The New York Times consulted etiquette author Jacqueline Whitmore and body language instructor Chris Ulrich to analyze Trump's handshakes with world leaders. Ulrich noted, "The bottom line, is that in every one of these, Trump takes up real estate in other world leaders' heads."  Whitmore analyzed Trump's handshake with Macron, "Looks like both men are in a battle to establish their dominance and control."

Academic analysis
Professor George A. Dunn, a specialist in philosophy and religion, claims that Trump's approach to public handshaking is "highly telling from a Confucian point of view", as handshakes are a highly stylized social ritual ("li") intended to communicate goodwill with a number of implicit rules of etiquette including the appropriate duration and the amount of force applied. Dunn writes that Trump's "numerous handshake malfunctions" could be interpreted as either insincere, incompetent or a deliberate deviation from the script, but that in general "Trump tends to use handshakes as an occasion to assert dominance, pulling the recipient in close, throwing in a couple of pats, and taking too long to finish... [a] power play that forces the other into a kind of submission." Dunn notes that Trump's approach to handshaking is the opposite of the description of handshaking written by Herbert Fingarette: "We shake hands not by my pulling your hand up and down or your pulling mine, but by spontaneous and cooperative action."

Trump's approach to handshakes has been studied in the academic field of semiotics.  Peter Wignell, Kay O'Halloran and Sabine Tan analyze the approach as follows:
What Trump's handshake attempts to do is take away options from the person on the other end of it, denying reciprocity. By getting in first and pulling the other person off balance the other person is denied the same option. They can retaliate by yanking back but Trump has gained the upper hand, literally, by asserting dominance first. A semblance of equality can only be reinstated by the other person either contesting the attempt at dominance or pre-emptively blocking it. Either way, what is, in an unmarked context, an unproblematic encounter between equals becomes a mini battle.

Professor Ben O'Loughlin, Professor of International Relations at Royal Holloway, University of London, conceptualized Trump's handshakes with world leaders as standoffs with a signalling effect: "moments of uncertainty when nobody knows what will happen, including the people shaking hands... [that] signal, together, Trump's standoff with international relations per se." O'Loughlin described the geopolitical effect of the handshakes as follows:
Trump's win-lose, zero-sum handshakes offer a visual presentation of isolationism that produces a jarring effect; they are a shock to long-established and near-universally shared norms of diplomatic conduct as well as policies that ostensibly maintain a liberal, multilateral world order made up of plural but largely cooperative governance mechanisms. The rest of the world can refuse to play Trump's game here, or play the game by enduring the handshakes while otherwise sustaining multilateral order themselves and making deals without Trump as was case in 2017 when Trump's administration opted out of climate change and trade deals.

O'Loughlin also described how the media's sustained amplification of the handshakes provide three significant insights into news values – the criteria which influence the selection and presentation of events as published news:
 News values' privileging of personalisation, calibration to powerful actors, and drama; all three criteria being met by the handshakes
 Modern digital "multisensorial mediums" allowing gesture to be communicated widely
 Journalistic realization of their complicity in overweighting the publicization of Trump's actions, and subsequent learning to contain and normalize their publication of such events

References

Bibliography

Academic publications

Media
 
 
 
 
 
 

Donald Trump
Greetings
Hand gestures
Nonverbal communication
Parting traditions